Ryan Langham (born 15 November 1981 in Blacktown, New South Wales) is a professional Australian boxer in the featherweight division. He was selected to compete for the Australian boxing team at the 2004 Summer Olympics, before turning himself into pro by the following year. From then on, Langham held a remarkable record of twenty-five bouts throughout his professional stint, including fifteen victories and five knock outs.

Langham qualified for the men's featherweight division (57 kg) at the 2004 Summer Olympics in Athens. Earlier in the process, he guaranteed a spot on the Australian boxing team after finishing first from the AIBA Oceania Qualification Tournament in Tonga. Langham lost his opening match to Romania's Viorel Simion with an effortless 40–15 score.

References

External links

Australian Olympic Team Bio

1981 births
Living people
Featherweight boxers
Olympic boxers of Australia
Boxers at the 2004 Summer Olympics
People from Blacktown, New South Wales
Sportsmen from New South Wales
Australian male boxers